Said Brahimi (17 March 1931, in Bône – 27 December 1997, in Annaba) was an Algerian-born French international football and Algerian international football player.

International goals
Scores and results list. France's goal tally first.

References

External links
 Profile

1931 births
1997 deaths
Association football forwards
Algerian footballers
Algerian emigrants to France
French footballers
France international footballers
FC Sète 34 players
Ligue 1 players
Ligue 2 players
People from Annaba
FLN football team players